Toa Samania (born Apia, March 4, 1970) is a former Samoan rugby union player. He played as a fullback.

Career
His first match with Samoa was in the match against Wales at Moamoa, on June 25, 1994, earning 9 caps, 22 points, 2 tries, 3 conversions and 4 penalties. He wasn't called in the Samoan team 1995 and 1999 Rugby World Cups. He retired from the international career after playing against Tonga, at Apia, on June 2, 2001. He played in the NPC for King Country, Taranaki and Bay of Plenty.

External links

Toa Samania at New Zealand Rugby History

1970 births
Living people
Sportspeople from Apia
Samoan rugby union players
Samoan expatriates in New Zealand
Rugby union fullbacks
Samoa international rugby union players
King Country rugby union players
Taranaki rugby union players
Bay of Plenty rugby union players